I8 or I-8 may refer to:

 Interstate 8, a highway in the southwestern United States
 Interstate 8 (EP), an extended play by Modest Mouse
 Resistance: Fall of Man, a video game originally known as I-8
 Straight-eight engine, an uncommon internal combustion engine
 , a submarine of the Imperial Japanese Navy
 BMW i8, a plug-in hybrid sports car 
 Uppland Regiment, a Swedish Army infantry regiment disbanded in 1957
 i8, a name for the 8-bit signed integer, especially in Rust